Dorothy of Oz may refer to:

 Dorothy of Oz (book), 1989 book written by Roger S. Baum
 Legends of Oz: Dorothy's Return, a 2013 animated film, originally titled Dorothy of Oz
 Dorothy of Oz (manhwa), Korean manhwa, based on The Wonderful Wizard of Oz
 Dorothy Gale, protagonist of the Oz series of books and principal character in adaptations, notably the classic film The Wizard of Oz